This is the singles discography for Glee.

Singles

Season 1: 2009–2010

Season 2: 2010–2011

Season 3: 2011–2012

Season 4: 2012–2013

Season 5: 2013–2014

Non-episode singles

Other charted songs 
A number of songs that were not specifically released as singles, but could still be individually downloaded from their albums/EPs, received enough individual downloads to appear on the singles charts.

Notes

References 

Discographies of American artists
Glee discographies
Pop music discographies